Bert Poulheim (1952–2006) was a German composer.

Life 
Poulheim was a student of Ruth Zechlin. In 1977, his work Die Uraufführung was premiered at the Club der Kulturschaffenden in Berlin. In 1979, he was awarded the Hanns Eisler Prize. In 1987, the premiere of the musical comedy Zug um Zug (text Hansjörg Schneider) took place at the Zeitz Theatre.

In 2007, the Bert Poulheim & Marion Violet Foundation was established.

Work 
 Symphony No. 1 (1978)
 Concerto for Bassoon and Orchestra (1979)
 Virtuoses for viola and piano (1977)
 Zeitspiele for solo flute (1982)
 Capriccio for bassoon and piano (1995)
 Impressions for bassoon and piano
 No wind music, but music for five winds for wind quintet (1983)
 Turkish Fantasy for four trombones and tuba (1987)
 Four Miniatures for three trombones (1980)
 Facets for piano
 Am Samovar for voice and guitar 
 Songs of a Year on texts from ancient Japanese poetry for mezzo-soprano and piano (1980)
 The Silent Carousel on texts by Marion Violet for mezzo-soprano and piano

Recordings 
 1978: Virtuoses für Viola und Klavier (Nova) with Alfred Lipka and Dieter Brauer
 1982: Fagottkonzert (Nova) with the Halleschen Philharmonie directed by Olaf Koch
 2000: Swinging Trombones (Koch-Schwann) with the Berlin Trombone Quintet
 2002: Das Stumme Karussell with Marion Violet and the Ensemble Capriccio Nova

References

External links 
 
 Works by Bert Poulheim at 
 

20th-century German composers
20th-century classical composers
1952 births
2006 deaths
Place of birth missing